Melvin Taylor (born March 13, 1959, Jackson, Mississippi) is an American electric blues guitarist, based in Chicago.

Career
Born in Mississippi, Taylor's parents moved to Chicago in 1962, taking him along.

He joined the Transistors, a popular music group. He switched his focus to blues music when the group disbanded in the early 1980s. He found work playing in clubs on the West Side of Chicago, often at Rosa's Lounge.

During the 1980s he joined Pinetop Perkins and the Legendary Blues Band in a year-long European tour. He has returned to Europe several times with his own group, which has opened for B.B. King, Buddy Guy, and Santana.

Taylor's recordings include two albums for Isabel Records, a French record label, Blues on the Run (1982) and Plays the Blues for You (1984). Recordings in the United States include Melvin Taylor and the Slack Band, with John Snyder, released by Evidence Music, and Dirty Pool (1997). Taylor's Beyond the Burning Guitar was recorded in Misty Creek Studios, in Fairfax, Virginia. He also recorded a cover of the Skylar Grey–Eminem song "Love the Way You Lie", with the rapper, Matt Christian, at Misty Creek Studios.

Discography
Blues on the Run (1982)
Plays the Blues for You (1984)
Melvin Taylor and the Slack Band (1995)
Dirty Pool (1997)
Bang That Bell (2000)
Rendezvous with the Blues (2002)
Beyond the Burning Guitar (2010)
Sweet Taste of Guitar (2012)
 Taylor Made (2013)

See also
List of contemporary blues musicians
List of guitarists

References

External links
 Melvin Taylor's official website
 Biography
 Rosa's Lounge
 New York Times Music Review

1959 births
Living people
Musicians from Jackson, Mississippi
American blues guitarists
American male guitarists
Chicago blues musicians
Electric blues musicians
Contemporary blues musicians
Guitarists from Chicago
Guitarists from Mississippi
20th-century American guitarists
20th-century American male musicians